Season three of Big Brother Germany lasted from 27 January 2001 to 12 May 2001 and was aired on RTL and RTL Zwei.

Season summary
After a very successful second season the producers did not hesitate to start the third installment of the show already a scarce month after the end of the second season with keeping the basic format the same. However the producers introduced three twists in hope of keeping the excitement up: The first one was that Coco and Katja, a dating couple entered the house together which marked the first time that two housemates knew each other before the show officially (several contestants met at auditions in former seasons). Also every housemate had now three nominations point to give out - two for the least liked and one for the second least liked person in the house. The same changes were made to the viewer's nominations. The biggest twist however was announced after the twelve original housemates entered the house on launch night: it was revealed that trained actress Silvia was a mole working for Big Brother. As a result of the heavy amount of voluntary exits during season 2, the contestants had to pay a deposit before entering the house and would receive 1.000 euro per week in their stay in the house. However, they would only get the deposit and the money they earned when they get evicted.

Due to the lack of diversity and conflicts between the housemates which have mostly been considered as "boring" and "dull" the producers decide to make an offer of 100.000 DM which the person that would voluntary walk on the same night would earn. After almost all the housemates wanted to take the offer, Anja walked away with the money. On the same night Big Brother revealed that there would be a mole in the house left it to everyone's speculation who that person was. Some days later Big Brother asked the Mole to reveal her identity to the other housemates and to leave the house afterwards. As replacements for Anja and Silvia, blonde bombshell Ana-Marija and Thomas, who was sitting in a wheelchair and was chosen by the viewers to move in, entered the house with none of them having any huge impact on the show either.

After 106 Days, Karina Schreiber won the season, just like the first two winners John Milz and Alida Kurras, Schreiber was raised in the GDR and was considered as the nicest person in the house and was never nominated.

The third season was a huge disappointment in terms of ratings and entertainment and saw the show being off the screen for more than two years with RTL never airing a Big Brother show anymore.

Housemates

Nominations table

See also
Main Article about the show

External links
Housemate pictures, Nominations and Evictions
All profiles if the housemates season 3 (German)

2001 German television seasons
03